HDHomeRun is a network-attached digital television tuner box, produced by the company SiliconDust USA, Inc.

Overview
Unlike standard set-top box (or set-top unit) appliances, HDHomeRun does not have a video output that connects directly to the user's television. Instead it receives a live TV signal and then streams the decoded video over a local area network to an existing smart phone, tablet computer, smart tv, set top streaming device, computer,  or game console. This allows it to stream content to multiple viewing locations.

General details
There are currently a number of HDHomeRun models on the market: 
single-tuner ATSC/clear QAM
dual-tuner ATSC/clear QAM 
dual-tuner commercial (TECH) ATSC/clear QAM
dual-tuner DVB-T/unencrypted DVB-C
three tuner CableCard/clear QAM
All models are designed to receive unencrypted digital broadcast or cable television and stream it over a network for use by any PC on the network.  HDHomeRun normally receives an IP address via DHCP but will also work via an auto IP address if no DHCP server is available.

The HDHomeRun Windows driver presents the tuners as standard BDA tuners, enabling BDA-compliant applications to work with the HDHomeRun. The HDHomeRun can also be controlled via a command-line application which is available for Windows, Mac OS X, Linux, FreeBSD, and other POSIX-compliant operating systems. The control library is open source and is available under the LGPL for use in custom applications.

Select retail packaged HDHomeRun units are distributed with Arcsoft TotalMedia Theatre.

Technical specifications

ATSC OTA models
 8VSB ATSC 1.0  US over-the-air digital TV
 ATSC 3.0 (HD*-4k models only)
 QAM 64/256  unencrypted digital cable TV
 100 Mbit RJ45 connection

CableCard models
 QAM 64/256  unencrypted digital cable TV
 CableCard  US encrypted digital cable TV
 1 Gbit RJ45 connection

ISDB model
 ISDB-T  South America over the air

DVB models
 DVB-T / DVB-T2 over-the-air unencrypted digital TV
 DVB-C  QAM 64/128/256 (annex A/C) unencrypted digital cable TV
 6/7/8 MHz channel bandwidth (Australia, Europe, New Zealand, Taiwan)
 100Mbit Ethernet RJ45 connection

Compatibility
The HDHomeRun can be controlled and viewed from a wide variety of DVR/PVR software. Microsoft provides Windows Media Center for Windows XP through 8, but discontinued the product in Windows 10. Apple macOS 10 runs EyeTV 3. Linux runs Myth TV.

Newer models of HDHomeRun are DLNA device compatible.

HDHomeRun Tuners
Consumer Tuners

Commercial Tuners

Sources:

HDHomeRun PRIME

Introduced Fall 2011, the HDHomeRun PRIME provided the ability to view and record all the digital cable channels they subscribe to without using a cable supplied set-top-box. The device employed a CableCARD to replace the set-top box.  The rental fee was usually much less than the rental fee for the cable box. The HDHomeRun PRIME integrated easily with Windows Media Center (WMC), included with Windows 7 and available with Windows 8, and turned your PC into an HD DVR. With 3 tuners, the PRIME let you record two programs and watch another live all at the same time. Although a few HDHomeRun Prime boxes can be found for sale on the internet, they are no longer in production. Cessation of production has been attributed to a change in FCC regulation, which no longer requires cable service providers to make CableCARDs available to their customers.

 CableCards are still available from many US digital cable providers.
 The Prime can be used without a CableCard in cable systems that still have clear QAM channels available. 
 The Prime does not support digital cable on-demand but can receive PPV that is ordered on the phone from your cable provider.
 The Prime is a dedicated cable TV device with no ATSC tuner and thus can not be used with an antenna.
 Windows Media Center is the most widely used software available for use with the Prime, and the only one with Digital Rights Management (DRM) to view and record premium cable channels like HBO. Many other software options are available; please see the list in this Wiki and the Silicondust website for details.  When running WMC, an additional, separate ATSC tuner can be used with the PC and WMC will combine both the Prime and ATSC tuner in the guide for live TV and recording. By default, WMC has a 4 tuner limit for each type (ATSC, CableCard) of tuner, but a 3rd party software product called TunerSalad increases the number of tuners to 32 per type; you can use up to 32 cable tuners (11 Primes = 33 cable tuners) and 32 ATSC tuners, for a total of 64 tuners. There is also another 3rd party software called My Channel Logos that adds channel logos to the WMC channel guide. For a detailed discussion of WMC, please see TheGreenButton.tv website.

WMC was included with Windows 7 but is an additional $100 for Windows 8/8.1 and an additional $10 for Windows 8/8.1 Pro. It is not available from Microsoft on Windows 10 but members at The Green Button are developing a way to use a modified version of WMC with Windows 10.

HDHomeRun DVR
The HDHomeRun DVR is a DVR software designed for installation on a network-attached storage device. It is intended to be used with an HDHomeRun tuner and is expected to overcome digital rights management complications.

HDHomeRun Premium TV
Launched in 2018, HDHomeRun Premium TV was a virtual MVPD service that worked with the HDHomeRun Prime and HDHomeRun DVR service. A unique feature of this service over most other MVPDs was the ability to record the channel streams to a local hard drive for time-shifted viewing. In March 2019, HDHomeRun announced that it would shut down its Premium service.

See also
 Monsoon HAVA
 Dreambox
 DBox2
 Slingbox
 LocationFree Player

References

External links
 

Television technology
Television placeshifting technology